The Rebellion of Kitty Belle is a 1914 American short drama film directed by  Christy Cabanne and starring Lillian Gish.

Cast
 Lillian Gish
 Dorothy Gish
 Robert Harron
 Kate Bruce
 Joseph Carle
 Alfred Paget
 Raoul Walsh (as Raoul A. Walsh)

References

External links

1914 films
American silent short films
1914 drama films
American black-and-white films
Films directed by Christy Cabanne
1914 short films
Silent American drama films
1910s American films
1910s English-language films
American drama short films